Sansuma Khunggur Bwiswmuthiary (born 1 January 1960) is a member of the 14th Lok Sabha of India. He represents the Kokrajhar constituency of Assam. He is an Independent.

Bwiswmuthiary has been elected to the Lok Sabha as an independent candidate from the Kokrajhar constituency in Assam in the years 1998, 1999, 2004 and 2009. Bwiswmuthiary is a Bodo nationalist, and favors the creation of an autonomous Bodoland region. His backers include the All Bodo Students Union and the National Democratic Alliance.

Bwiswmuthiary is a supporter of the Indo-US nuclear deal.

Personal life
Bwiswmuthiary is a Boro and was born on 1 January 1960 to father Bwrai Mahajwn Bwiswmuthiary and mother Ishari (Ashagi) Bwiswmuthiary in Goybari village of Baksa district in Assam. He did his schooling from Ouabari Lower Primary School, Hashraobari and Borobazar High School, Bijni. Graduated with a B.A. (Hons. in Political Science) from Kokrajhar College, under Guwahati University. Also attained Prabin diploma in Hindi from Assam Rashtra Bhasha Prachar Samiti, Guwahati. He married Uttara Bwiswmuthiary on 	18 February 1981, with whom he has four sons.

References

External links
 Home Page on the Parliament of India's Website

1960 births
Living people
Bodo people
India MPs 2004–2009
People from Kokrajhar
India MPs 2009–2014
India MPs 1999–2004
India MPs 1998–1999
Lok Sabha members from Assam
Independent politicians in India
Bodoland People's Front politicians